Anatomy of a Psycho is a 1961 American crime thriller film directed by Boris Petroff (as Brooke L. Peters). Ed Wood reportedly contributed to Jane Mann's screenplay as Larry Lee. Ronnie Burns, adopted son of George Burns and Gracie Allen, plays the romantic lead. The film was shot at the Alexander Film Company studios in Colorado Springs in 1959 it was the only feature film produced by the company. The film had the working title of Young Scarface; by the time film the film received a distributor it was retitled to exploit Anatomy of a Murder (1959) and Psycho (1960).

Co-screenwriter Don Devlin who played Moe was the father of producer Dean Devlin, Jane Mann was the wife of Boris Petroff.

Premise 
Duke Marco has raised his kid brother Chet and his sister like a father. When Duke is sentenced to death after a trial for murder, Chet increasingly experiences paranoia and psychosis, which not even his sister, best friend or girlfriend can relieve. Ultimately losing touch with surrounding reality, he assaults the son of the prosecuting attorney, beats up the judge's son and sets his house on fire then attempts to get the son of the judge on a murder charge. However, Lieutenant Mac, a local police officer, discovers Chet's involvement and hunts him down, leading to a tragic denouement.

Cast 
Ronnie Burns as Mickey
Pamela Lincoln as Pat
 Darrell Howe as Chet
 Judy Howard as Sandy
Michael Granger as Lt. Mac
 Frank Killmond as Bobbie
 Russ Bender as Frank
 Don Devlin as Moe
 William Salzwedel as Duke
 Robert Stabler as Defense Attorney
 John B. Lee as District Attorney
Pat McMahon as Arthur (uncredited)

Soundtrack
The film uses public domain music originally used for Wood's Plan 9 from Outer Space (1959).

Title Psycho Darrel Howe sung two songs in the film Gonna Go Round and I Make a Wish, with the 45 record crediting Young Scarface.

DVD release 
The film was released on DVD in 2001.

See also
Ed Wood filmography

References

Further reading
 The Haunted World of Edward D. Wood, Jr. (1996), documentary film directed by Brett Thompson
 Rudolph Grey, Nightmare of Ecstasy: The Life and Art of Edward D. Wood, Jr. (1992)

External links 

 

 Anatomy of a Psycho free online streaming

1961 films
American crime thriller films
1960s crime thriller films
1960s English-language films
American black-and-white films
Films with screenplays by Ed Wood
Films shot in Colorado
1960s American films